Hermann Robert Dietrich (14 December 1879 – 6 March 1954) was a German politician of the liberal German Democratic Party and served as a minister during the Weimar Republic.

Finance Minister of Germany

In 1930, Dietrich succeeded Paul Moldenhauer as Finance Minister of the Weimar Republic. In the midst of the Great Depression, Dietrich became the "chief proponent" of government contracts in 1930 in an attempt to offset the drastic increase in unemployment. Because the contracts were contingent on the reduction of prices, he and the Provisional National Economic Council had to authorise the reduction of wages in the German industrial community. 

Dietrich, along with the economists Heinrich Brüning and Adam Stegerwald, firmly believed that accelerating the pace of the agricultural sector at the cost of Germany's industrial capacity would solve unemployment. 

During President Paul von Hindenburg's bid for re-election, Dietrich was one of few elites in the cabinet barred from speaking at the president's candidacy campaigns for allegedly being "too far left".

References

External links
 

1879 births
1954 deaths
People from Emmendingen (district)
People from the Grand Duchy of Baden
German Protestants
National Liberal Party (Germany) politicians
German Democratic Party politicians
German State Party politicians
Free Democratic Party (Germany) politicians
Economy ministers of Germany
Finance ministers of Germany
Members of the Weimar National Assembly
Members of the Reichstag of the Weimar Republic
Members of the Second Chamber of the Diet of the Grand Duchy of Baden
Knights Commander of the Order of Merit of the Federal Republic of Germany